Ishangopalpur massacre refers to the massacre of Bengali Hindus in Ishangopalpur village, in the outskirts of Faridpur on 2 May 1971. The Pakistan army shot and bayoneted 28 Bengali Hindus to death.

Background 
On 25 March 1971, the Pakistan army launched Operation Searchlight in East Pakistan. They targeted Hindus as a community for extermination. After a few weeks, they arrived at Faridpur and set up an army base. In the meanwhile, the Hindus of the locality had begun to flee. Around 60 Bengali Hindu families from Faridpur took shelter in Ishangopalpur, a village located six to seven kilometers from the town. The house of former Hindu landlord Ishan Sarkar was located in the village. His grandson Lakshman Sen was staying at the house at that time. After 21 April, NAP leader Chittaranjan Ghosh, his elder brother Jagadish Chandra Ghosh along with a few influential persons from the Bengali Hindu community took shelter in the house. Some of them began to train themselves to fight the Pakistan army.

Killings 
On 2 May, local people led a contingent of the Pakistani army towards the village. They proceeded to the house of Ishan Sarkar. As the residents attempted to flee, they were caught at gunpoint. 29 inmates of the house were rounded up and led to the banks of a pond nearby. They were kicked, punched and bayoneted. Then the adult males were killed one by one in front of their wives and children. Before leaving, the Pakistan soldiers warned in Urdu that no freedom fighter or Hindus would be spared. One person survived after escaping with a bullet wound. The dead were buried beside the pond.

Aftermath 
After the independence of Bangladesh, the mass killing site remained unchanged. In 2010, family members of the victims erected a memorial at the mass killing site. On 2 May 2010, the victims were commemorated and verses from the Gita were recited for the peace of the departed souls.

References 

1971 Bangladesh genocide
Massacres of Bengali Hindus in East Pakistan
Massacres of men
Persecution of Hindus
Persecution by Muslims
1971 in Bangladesh
Massacres in 1971
Massacres committed by Pakistan in East Pakistan
May 1971 events in Asia
Violence against men in Asia